Philip Anthony Blake (born November 27, 1985) is a professional Canadian football offensive lineman for the Saskatchewan Roughriders of the Canadian Football League (CFL). He played college football at Baylor University. He has also been a member of the Denver Broncos, Arizona Cardinals, Montreal Alouettes, and Toronto Argonauts.

College career
Blake attended Tyler Junior College in 2008. Prior to 2009, he transferred to Baylor University. In his three years at Baylor, he started all 38 games at either center or right tackle. As a senior, he was an All-Big 12 selection.

Professional career
He was drafted by the Montreal Alouettes in the 2011 CFL Draft, but decided to return to Baylor. He later was drafted in the fourth round of the 2012 NFL Draft by the Denver Broncos with the pick they received from the New York Jets in exchange for Tim Tebow.

Denver Broncos
After being drafted by the Denver Broncos in the 2012 NFL Draft, Blake signed with the team on June 1, 2012. He never dressed for a regular season game with the team and was released on August 31, 2013.

Arizona Cardinals
On September 2, 2013, the Arizona Cardinals signed Blake to their practice squad. The Cardinals released Blake on August 30, 2014.

Montreal Alouettes
After spending the 2014 season out of football, Blake signed a three-year contract with the Montreal Alouettes on January 8, 2015.

Saskatchewan Roughriders 
On October 10, 2018, Blake was traded alongside teammate Patrick Lavoie to the Saskatchewan Roughriders in exchange for wide receiver Joshua Stanford and a second-round selection in the 2020 CFL Draft.

Toronto Argonauts 
On February 11, 2020, Blake signed with the Toronto Argonauts. However, he did not play in 2020 due to the cancellation of the 2020 CFL season and he re-structured his contract with the Argonauts on January 31, 2021. Blake played in 11 games for the Argonauts in 2021 and also played in the team's East Final loss to the Hamilton Tiger-Cats that year. In 2022, he played and started in 17 regular season games and made the shift to left tackle late in the season as the team endured injuries. Blake started at left tackle in the 109th Grey Cup game and won his first Grey Cup championship as the Argonauts defeated the Winnipeg Blue Bombers 24–23. He became a free agent upon the expiry of his contract on February 14, 2023.

Saskatchewan Roughriders
On February 14, 2023, it was announced that Blake had signed with the Saskatchewan Roughriders.

References

External links
Saskatchewan Roughriders bio 
NFL Combine profile
Baylor Bears bio

1985 births
Living people
American football centers
American football offensive tackles
Canadian football offensive linemen
Tyler Apaches football players
Baylor Bears football players
Denver Broncos players
Arizona Cardinals players
Black Canadian players of American football
Montreal Alouettes players
Players of Canadian football from Ontario
Sportspeople from Toronto
Saskatchewan Roughriders players
Toronto Argonauts players